Productivity, in economics, is the amount of output created produced per unit input used.

Productivity may also refer to:
Agricultural productivity, the ratio of agricultural outputs to agricultural inputs.
Productivity (linguistics), the degree to which a grammatical process can be extended to new cases.
Productivity (ecology), the rate of generation of biomass in an ecosystem.
Primary production, in ecology is a measure of the amount of energy incorporated into a biological system.
Productivity (economic history), the historical role of technology and non technology factors in creating the modern economy.
Programming productivity, the degree of the ability of individual programmers or development teams to build and evolve software systems.
Time management, the process of planning and exercising conscious control over the amount of time spent on specific activities, especially to increase effectiveness, efficiency or productivity.
Productivity software, application software used for producing information (such as documents, presentations, worksheets, databases, charts, graphs, digital paintings, electronic music and digital video).

See also